St John's College  is a secondary school in Ballyfermot, Dublin, Ireland. The school is run by the De La Salle Christian Brothers. St John's College is fully funded by the Department of Education and Skills. The current Principal is Ann Marie Leonard, since 2007 and the current Deputy Principal is Adrienne Murphy, since 2008.

Cohort
This school offers four class levels. 1st year, 2nd year and third year which have 4 classes. Each class has the average number of 15–23 students. St John's offers the transition year all student from 3rd go into different classes for different subjects. In 5th year, students are divided into two-year programmes called Leaving Certificate, Leaving Certificate Applied and Leaving Certificate Vocational Programme. Students have a choice to pick one of these programs which continue into the 6th year.

In December, students participate in the Christmas Examinations. In March, 3 and 6 year students sit the Pre-Junior Certificate Examinations or the Pre-Leaving Certificate Examinations. 1st, 2nd and 5th year students sit the Summer Examinations in late May and early June. Junior  Certificate Examinations and Leaving Certificate Examinations are held on 10 June.

School history 

This college was founded in 1956 by the Institute of the Brothers of the Christian Schools and is managed by the Institute as a state-funded institution. The college is based on the principles of Jean-Baptiste de La Salle, a pioneer in modern education who founded the Institute of the Brothers of the Christian Schools. Commonly known as the De La Salle Brothers in Britain, Ireland, Australasia and Asia, they are known in the United States and Canada as the Christian Brothers. They are sometimes confused with a similar congregation founded in Ireland by Edmund Ignatius Rice commonly known as the Irish Christian Brothers.

Notable alumni

St John's College has a history of producing soccer players over the years, some of whom have progressed te system. 

Joe Duffy, broadcaster. The school featured in his Joe.
Flood

Brian Shelley

References

External links
 De La Salle Christian Brothers
 De La Salle Christian Brothers, Province of Great Britain
 Brief history of the Lasallian Institute
 Catholic Encyclopedia article
 
 Department of Education and Skills
 State Examination Commission
 Scoilnet

Dublin
Secondary schools in Dublin (city)
Educational organisations based in Ireland
Educational institutions established in 1956
1956 establishments in Ireland

ast:Hermanos de les Escueles Cristianes
ca:Germans de les Escoles Cristianes de La Salle
de:Brüder der christlichen Schulen
es:Hermanos de las Escuelas Cristianas
fr:Frères des Écoles chrétiennes
it:Fratelli delle Scuole Cristiane
nl:Broeders van de Christelijke Scholen
ja:ラ・サール会
pl:Bracia Szkolni
pt:Irmãos das Escolas Cristãs
ro:Frații Școlilor Creștine
ru:Братья христианских школ
sv:Ignorantbröder
vi:Dòng La San
zh:喇沙會